Guillaume Piguel (December 4, 1722 – June 21, 1771) served as the Apostolic Vicar of Cochin (1762–1771).

Biography
Guillaume Piguel was born in La Mézière, France and was an ordained priest of the Société des Missions étrangères de Paris on December 21, 1748. On July 29, 1762, Pope Clement XIII appointed him Apostolic Vicar of Cochin and Titular Bishop of Canatha. On December 9, 1764, he was consecrated bishop by Pierre Brigot, Apostolic Vicar of Siam.

References

1722 births
1771 deaths
French Roman Catholic titular bishops
Paris Foreign Missions Society missionaries
18th-century Roman Catholic bishops in Vietnam
French Roman Catholic bishops in Asia
Bishops appointed by Pope Clement XIII
Roman Catholic missionaries in Vietnam
French expatriates in Vietnam